The 2009–10 A-League was the 33rd season of top-flight soccer in Australia, and the fifth season of the A-League competition since its establishment in 2004. The season marked the addition of two new teams from Queensland. Gold Coast United FC and the North Queensland Fury FC made their A-League debuts at the start of the season. Because of this, Queensland Roar were renamed to Brisbane Roar, as they were no longer the only A-League club from Queensland. With the inception of the two new clubs, many club transfers took place both within Australia and New Zealand, and around the world.

The length of the regular season was longer than in previous years, with 27 rounds rather than 21, plus finals. The season began on 6 August, with Melbourne hosting the Central Coast at home. As well as these major changes to the league, the Pre-Season Challenge Cup was no longer held as part of the 2009–10 season due to a busier regular season schedule, and clubs attracting higher profile pre-season friendlies. The Premiership and Championship double was completed by Sydney FC with victory over Melbourne in the final match of the regular season and on penalties in the Championship Grand Final.

Clubs

Transfers

Managerial changes

Foreign players

The following do not fill a Visa position:
1Those players who were born and started their professional career abroad but have since gained Australian Residency (and New Zealand Residency, in the case of Wellington Phoenix);
2Australian residents (and New Zealand residents, in the case of Wellington Phoenix) who have chosen to represent another national team;
3Injury Replacement Players, or National Team Replacement Players;
4Guest Players (eligible to play a maximum of ten games)

Salary cap exemptions and captains

Regular season

Home and away season
The 2009–10 A-League season was played over 27 rounds, followed by a finals series.

Round 1

Round 2

Round 3

Round 4

Round 5

Round 6

Round 7

Round 8

Round 9

Round 10

Round 11

Round 12

Round 13

Round 14

Round 15

Round 16

Round 17

Round 18

Round 19

Round 20

Round 21

Round 22

Round 23

Round 24

Round 25

Round 26

Round 27

Finals series

Melbourne Victory won 4–3 on aggregate.

Season statistics

Top scorers

Attendance 
These are the attendance records of each of the teams at the end of the home and away season. The table does not include finals series attendances.

Top 10 Attendances

Discipline
The Fair Play Award will go to the team with the lowest points on the fair play ladder at the conclusion of the home and away season. It was awarded to Premiers Sydney FC who scraped in by 4 points from rivals Melbourne Victory. 

* The Newcastle Jets' Tarek Elrich received a direct red card in their round 7 fixture against Sydney FC. However, this was successfully appealed by the club and expunged from Elrich and the team's records.
* Adelaide United's Iain Fyfe received a direct red card in their round 19 fixture against Perth Glory. However, this was overruled by the match review panel and expunged from Fyfe and the team's records.

See also
 2009 Australian football code crowds

Team season articles

 2009–10 Adelaide United FC season
 2009–10 Brisbane Roar FC season
 2009–10 Central Coast Mariners FC season
 2009–10 Gold Coast United FC season
 2009–10 Melbourne Victory FC season
 2009–10 Newcastle Jets FC season
 2009–10 North Queensland Fury FC season
 2009–10 Perth Glory FC season
 2009–10 Sydney FC season
 2009–10 Wellington Phoenix FC season

References

 
A-League Men seasons
Aus
1
1